Sunnybrae Cottage is a building in the Scottish town of Pitlochry, Perth and Kinross. A Category A listed cottage dating from the late 18th or early 19th century, but incorporating earlier materials, it stands at the corner of Atholl Road and Larchwood Road. It was Category B listed until 1998 and was formerly a scheduled monument. Its scheduled status was removed in 2013. It is a rare surviving example of a cruck-framed thatched cottage, and is in the care of Historic Environment Scotland.

The corrugated iron roof was installed over its thatched roof.

In 1881, Catherine McDougall, a 74-year-old retired dressmaker, lived in the cottage.

Rear of property

See also
List of listed buildings in Pitlochry, Perth and Kinross
List of Historic Environment Scotland properties

References

18th-century establishments in Scotland
Listed buildings in Pitlochry
Category A listed buildings in Perth and Kinross
Historic Environment Scotland properties in Perth and Kinross